Nikoloz Sherazadishvili (born 19 February 1996) is a Georgian-born, Spanish judoka.

Early life
Sherazadishvili began training in the sports of Judo and Water Polo at the age of 10, and immigrated to Madrid, Spain with his parents at the age of 14, he then decided to focus on Judo, where he would enter a club ran by former-Olympian, Joaquín "Quino" Ruiz, in Brunete, just outside Madrid.  Sherazadishvili was granted Spanish citizenship in 2014, so he could begin competing under the Spanish flag.

Judo career

2018
In April 2018, Sherazadishvili competed at the 2018 European Judo Championships in Tel Aviv, Israel, where he would successfully win a bronze medal.  He lost to Mikhail Igolnikov in the quarter-final match by ippon in 18 seconds; however, he then rebounded against Belarus' judoka, Yahor Varapayeu to give Sherazadishvili his first ever senior continental medal.

2018 World Judo Championships
On 24 September 2018, Sherazadishvili qualified for his first senior world championships, which were held in Baku, Azerbaijan.  He would beat Iceland's Blondal in his first match and rematch his former opponent and 2018 European champion, Mikhail Igolnikov whom he would defeat by waza-ari.  In the fourth round he would defeat Turkish judoka, Mikail Ozerler and would defeat former World Champion, Asley Gonzalez in the quarter-finals; advancing Sherazadishvili to the semi-finals.  Sherazadishvili met with Hungary's Krisztian Toth whom he defeated by ippon and advanced to the finals against Ivan Felipe Silva.  Sherazadishvili made history and became Spain's first ever world champion, when he won by ippon in the finals.

References

External links
  
 
 

1996 births
Living people
Male judoka from Georgia (country)
Spanish male judoka
Sportspeople from Tbilisi
Spanish people of Georgian descent
World judo champions
Expatriate sportspeople from Georgia (country) in Spain
Mediterranean Games gold medalists for Spain
Mediterranean Games medalists in judo
Competitors at the 2018 Mediterranean Games
European Games competitors for Spain
Judoka at the 2015 European Games
Judoka at the 2019 European Games
Judoka at the 2020 Summer Olympics
Olympic judoka of Spain